Volongo (locally ) is a comune (municipality) in the Province of Cremona in the Italian region Lombardy, located about  southeast of Milan and about  northeast of Cremona.

Volongo borders the following municipalities: Casalromano, Fiesse, Gambara, Isola Dovarese, Ostiano, Pessina Cremonese.

References

Cities and towns in Lombardy